Cola de mono or Colemono (literally, monkey's tail) is a traditional Chilean drink served around Christmas time.  It is similar to a White Russian.

Although there are many versions of this drink, it contains mainly aguardiente, milk, sugar, coffee, and cloves. A virgin version can be made simply without the alcohol.

Etymology

There are several theories surrounding the origin of the name. Since this drink is homemade, it was originally bottled in bottles whose labels were from the company Anís del Mono. Eventually the play on words of cola de mono was created.  The more accepted theory, however, is related to President Pedro Montt, nicknamed El Mono Montt, or Monkey Montt. During an evening party, Montt prepared to leave and asked for his revolver, a Colt. He was convinced to stay and continue on with the festivities. After all of the wine was drunk and the guests still thirsty for more, mixed milk, coffee, aguardiente, and sugar. Within time, the drink gained popularity and was dubbed "Colt de Montt", eventually morphing into "Cola de Mono" and later "Colemono", which is the name used in the "RAE" dictionaries and in common speech.

References

See also
 
 

Chilean alcoholic drinks
Christmas food